The Friedrich Naumann Foundation for Freedom (FNF), is a German foundation for liberal politics, related to the Free Democratic Party. Established in 1958 by Theodor Heuss, the first president of the Federal Republic of Germany, it promotes individual freedom and classical liberalism. Usually still referred to as the Friedrich Naumann Foundation, the foundation supplemented its name in 2007 with the words "for Freedom".

The foundation follows the ideals of the Protestant theologian, Friedrich Naumann. At the beginning of the last century, Naumann was a leading German liberal thinker and politician. He resolutely backed the idea of civic education. Naumann believed that a functioning democracy needs politically informed and educated citizens. According to him, civic education is a prerequisite for political participation and thus for democracy.

In this regard, the foundation is an agent of organized liberalism. It promotes this through civic education, international political dialogues, and political counselling. The foundation has numerous offices in Europe, Africa, America, and Asia. It also enjoys close links with Germany's Free Democratic Party (FDP) and Liberal International (LI).

While the foundation's activities in the field of civic education consist of seminars, conferences and publications aimed at promoting liberal values and principles, the international political dialogue program provides a discussion forum for a wide range of liberal issues. The foundation's counselling programs focus on candidates for political office, liberal political parties and other democratic organizations.

Scholarship program 
The Friedrich Naumann Foundation, together with other foundations of different philosophical, political and ideological orientation and the non-political German National Academic Foundation, acts as an instrument for the promotion of excellence in German tertiary education. This scholarship system is funded by the Federal Government.
Around 1% of university students in Germany hold one of these federally funded merit scholarships. Currently, the Friedrich Naumann Foundation provides scholarships to approximately 800 students, among those 175 PhD students (as of 2009). Scholarships are granted after a competitive multi-stage admission process. The selection is based on grades, letters of recommendation, leadership potential, community service, and a visible commitment to liberal values. Around 20% of the scholarships are held by foreign students studying at a university in Germany.

Foreign involvement 
In Peru, the foundation was involved in a misunderstanding on a meeting related to the some members of the Congress. The Peru Office Director testified before the Peruvian Congress to clear the misunderstanding.

See also

Archive of Liberalism
Contributions to liberal theory
Liberal democracy
Liberalism worldwide
Konrad Adenauer Foundation (CDU)
Heinrich Böll Foundation (Grüne)
Friedrich Ebert Foundation (SPD)
Rosa Luxemburg Foundation (Die Linke).
Hanns Seidel Foundation  (CSU)
German National Academic Foundation (non-political and non-denominational)

References

External links
Homepage of the Friedrich Naumann Foundation (Engl)
  Instituto Friedrich Naumann para a Liberdade - *[https://web.archive.org/web/20090716193343/http://www.ffn-brasil.org.br/novo/?secao=Atualidades   Instituto Friedrich Naumann para a Liberdade - Brasil
Friedrich Naumann Foundation for Liberty, Jerusalem Office (Engl, Hebrew, Arabic)
Scholarship Funds and Foundations in Germany I

Classical liberalism
Free Democratic Party (Germany)
Liberal organizations
Liberalism in Germany
Political and economic think tanks based in Germany
Political and economic research foundations
Political organisations based in Germany